Otter National Forest was established by the U.S. Forest Service in Montana on March 2, 1907, with . On July 1, 1908, the name was changed to Custer National Forest.

The forest comprises the Ashland Ranger District of Custer National Forest, in Powder River County and Rosebud County.

See also
 List of forests in Montana

References

External links
Ashland Ranger District, Custer National Forest
Forest History Society
Forest History Society: Listing of the National Forests of the United States Text from Davis, Richard C., ed. Encyclopedia of American Forest and Conservation History. New York: Macmillan Publishing Company for the Forest History Society, 1983. Vol. II, pp. 743-788.

Former National Forests of Montana
Protected areas of Powder River County, Montana
Protected areas of Rosebud County, Montana
1907 establishments in Montana